Kharwa, or Kharva, (Gujarati: ISO 15919: Khārvā) are a jati from Gujarat, India.

History
The Kharwa community is distributed throughout the coastal areas of Saurashtra and Kutch. Some Kharwas from Diu also migrated to Mozambique and later from there to Lisbon. The Maratha Empire recruited Kharwas along with Bhandaris and Kolis in large numbers for their navy in the mid-1600s. Kharwas were skilled fishermen and seamen who had experience on the seas having traveled to places as far away as Aden, Zanzibar and Singapore. They were also experienced with building ships.

Society and culture 
Cross-cousin marriage is practised amongst the Kharwas.

Religion

Beliefs and practices 
Kharwas are Hindu and worship various forms of Devi, including Ambaji, Bhadrakali, Bahuchara and Chamunda in Porbandar. Other Mātās worshiped include Samudrī, Sikotarī and Hinglāj. In Kutch Khojī, Dilvadī, Mamai, Padmani, Poravel and Veravani Mātās are also worshiped. Dariyalal is another important deity worshipped by Kharwas and other seafaring communities, including Muslim communities. The Kharwas of Mandvi tend to be Vaishnavs, while those of Somnath and Veraval are Shaivites.

Festivals 
Like other marine communities, Kharwas celebrate the opening of the seafaring season, after the passage of the Monsoon on Narial Purnima which falls on the full moon in the month of Śravaṇ. Various offerings, including flowers, coconuts and incense sticks are offered to the deity of the sea, Samudra.  Shravan Purnnima is celebrated with Shiva, Varuna, Marut, Parjanya and Ratnākar are worshiped, with Ganesha to remove any obstacles from their upcoming journeys into the sea. On Bhadravi Amavasya, a fair is held to propitiate Shiva. A lingam is installed along the coast and as the water level rises around it, it is believed that the spirit of Samudra has entered.  Another fair is held on the birthday of Dariyalal on the second day of Chaitra, where sweet rice is eaten as prasad.

Present circumstances
Importing and exporting goods by ship remains the traditional occupation of the community. They trade in many countries, including Oman, U.A.E, Somalia, and also other parts of Africa. Many Kharwa now have their own ships for exporting goods and have set up different cooperative societies.

References

Sources 

 

Social groups of Gujarat
Indian castes